Wachsman is a surname. Notable people with the surname include:

Alois Wachsman (1898–1942), Czech painter, stage designer and architect
Gillian Wachsman (born 1966), American pair skater
Klaus Wachsman or Klaus Wachsmann (1907–1984), British ethnomusicologist of German birth
Nachshon Wachsman, Israeli soldier captured by Hamas and killed during a rescue attempt

See also

Wachmann
Wachsmann
Wachuma
Waksman
Wassan
Waxman
Wichmann (disambiguation)

fr:Wachsman